Lee-Ann Martin (born is a Mohawk art curator and writer.  Martin was born in Toronto, Ontario.

Career
Martin was the Curator of Contemporary Canadian Aboriginal Art for the Canadian Museum of History. Martin was the head curator of art at the Mackenzie Art Gallery, Regina from 1998 to 2000.

In 2018 she curated an exhibition of 150 Indigenous women artists on billboards across Canada titled Resilience.

In 2019 she was awarded a Governor General's Awards in Visual and Media Arts.

References

Living people
Governor General's Award in Visual and Media Arts winners
First Nations women writers
Canadian art curators
Canadian Mohawk people
Writers from Toronto
21st-century First Nations writers
Year of birth missing (living people)
Canadian women curators
Indigenous curators of the Americas